Nicholas Kemboi (born November 25, 1983, in Kericho) is an athlete from Qatar who specialises in long-distance running. Unlike many other Kenyan-born athletes, he kept his name when changing affiliation to the Middle Eastern country.

He is the fourth fastest man of all time at 10,000 meters, with a personal best of 26:30.03 set in 2003 at the young age of 20. He was the silver medallist in the event at the 2009 Asian Athletics Championships.

He made a step up to the marathon distance in 2011, running a best of 2:08:01 hours at the Valencia Marathon. He was twelve minutes slower at the Istanbul Marathon in 2012, but earned his first victory in 2013 with a win at the Prague Marathon in 2:08:51 hours.

International competitions

Personal bests 
Track:
1500 metres - 3:47.10 (2005)
3000 metres - 7:50.99 (2005)
5000 metres - 13:01.14 (2003)
10,000 metres - 26:30.03 (2003)
Road:
10 kilometres - 27:57 (2011)
15 kilometres - 43:56 (2003)
Half marathon - 1:00:27 (2011)
Marathon – 2:08:01 (2011)

References

External links

1983 births
Living people
People from Kericho County
Kenyan male long-distance runners
Kenyan male marathon runners
Qatari male long-distance runners
Qatari male marathon runners
World Athletics Championships athletes for Qatar
Kenyan emigrants to Qatar
Naturalised citizens of Qatar
Qatari people of Kenyan descent
Kenyan male cross country runners